This is a list in alphabetical order of cricketers who have played for Northamptonshire County Cricket Club (Northants) in top-class matches since 1905 when the club joined the County Championship and the team was elevated to official first-class status. Northants has been classified as a List A team since the beginning of limited overs cricket in 1963 and as a top-level Twenty20 team since the inauguration of the Twenty20 Cup in 2003.

The details are the player's usual name followed by the years in which he was active as a Northants player and then his name is given as it would appear on modern match scorecards. Note that many players represented other top-class teams besides Northants and that some played for the club in minor counties cricket before 1905. Current players are shown as active to the latest season in which they played for the club. The list excludes Second XI and other players who did not play for the club's first team, and players whose first-team appearances were in minor matches only. The list has been updated to the end of the 2021 cricket season using the data published in Playfair Cricket Annual, 2022 edition.

A

B

C

D

E
 William East (1895–1914) : W. East 
 Thomas Elderkin (1934) : T. Elderkin 
 Harold Ellis (1908–1910) : H. Ellis 
 John Emburey (1996–1997) : J. E. Emburey 
 Luke Evans (2010) : L. Evans 
 Laurie Evans (2016) : L. J. Evans

F

G

H

I
 Kevin Innes (1994–2005) : K. J. Innes
 Matthew Inness (2002) : M. W. H. Inness
 Wilfred Izzard (1919–1920) : W. C. Izzard

J

K

L

M

N

O
 Francis O'Brien (1938–1939) : F. P. O'Brien
 Niall O'Brien (2007–2012) : N. J. O'Brien
 Norman Oldfield (1948–1954) : N. Oldfield
 Martin Olley (1983) : M. W. C. Olley
 Wayne Osman (1970–1971) : W. M. Osman

P

R

S

T

V
 Chaminda Vaas (2010–2012) : W. P. U. J. C. Vaas
 Johan van der Wath (2007–2009) : J. J. van der Wath
 Martin van Jaarsveld (2004) : M. van Jaarsveld
 Denis Vann (1936–1937) : D. W. A. Vann
 Ricardo Vasconcelos (2018–2021) : R. S. Vasconcelos
 Richard Venes (1922) : R. S. Venes
 George Vials (1904–1922) : G. A. T. Vials
 Roy Virgin (1973–1977) : R. T. Virgin

W

Y
 Jim Yardley (1976–1982) : T. J. Yardley
 Walter Yarnold (1928) : W. K. Yarnold

Z
 Saif Zaib (2015–2021) : S. A. Zaib

See also
 List of Northamptonshire cricket captains

Notes

References

Northamptonshire
 
Northamptonshire County Cricket Club
Cricket